The 1993 UTEP Miners football team was an American football team that represented the University of Texas at El Paso in the Western Athletic Conference during the 1993 NCAA Division I-A football season. After a 1–6 start to the season, fifth year head coach David Lee was fired and replaced with defensive coordinator Charlie Bailey. The Miners then ended the season with five more losses and finished with an 1–11 record.

Schedule

References

UTEP
UTEP Miners football seasons
UTEP Miners football